Women University Swabi is a public university situated in Swabi, Khyber Pakhtunkhwa, Pakistan. The university is run by the provincial government and was founded in 2016.

Vision 
Women University, Swabi intends to produce world class leaders, educationists, scientists, researchers, IT professionals, artists, social scientists, policy makers having sound knowledge, vision, integrity and moral values.

Mission 
The University is committed to inculcate quality education at affordable prices to its graduates, who will play vital role in building sagacious societies, dignified nations and socially responsible global community.

Departments and faculties 
The university currently has the following departments.
 Department of Food Science and Nutrition
 Department of Public Health and Epidemiology
 Department of  Microbiology & Molecular Biology     
 Department of  Health Informatics      
 Department of  Diagnostic Medical Sonography   
 Department of  Clinical Laboratory Sciences    
 Department of Art, Design & Cultural Studies
 Department of Botany
 Department of Zoology
 Department of Chemistry
 Department of English language & literature
 Department of Economics
 Department of Islamic Studies
 Department of Political Science
 Department of Psychology
 Department of Pakistan Studies
 Department of Urdu
 Department of Computer Science
 Department of Statistics
 Department of Mathematics
 Department of Law
 Department of Physics
 Department of Social Work
IT Section
In the IT section Dr. Muhammad Furqan works as In-Charge IT. The other team members are Waseem Khan, Johar Ali, and Fawad Azam .

See also 
 Ghulam Ishaq Khan Institute of Engineering Sciences and Technology
 University of Swabi
 Women University Mardan
 Shaheed Benazir Bhutto Women University, Peshawar
 Government Post Graduate College (Swabi)

References

External links 

Women's universities and colleges in Pakistan
Educational institutions established in 2016
2016 establishments in Pakistan
Public universities and colleges in Khyber Pakhtunkhwa
Swabi District
Universities and colleges in Swabi District